Arlington Cemetery is a cemetery in the Drexel Hill neighborhood of Upper Darby, Pennsylvania.

Overview
The Arlington Cemetery Company was founded in 1895.

The Arlington Cemetery now consists of the Mount Vernon Office, Topitzer Funeral Home, Williamsburg Chapel, The Underground Railroad Museum, The Museum of Mourning Art, The Garden Mausoleum, The Monticello Mausoleum, and a greenhouse. In addition, the cemetery itself is divided up into about 18 sections, each individually named.

Monticello Mausoleum
The Monticello Mausoleum is loosely modeled after the original Virginia home of Thomas Jefferson. There is a bronze bell under the dome that was cast in the foundry of Paul Revere. The bell was originally made for a church in Vermont, the bell was then moved to Pennsylvania.

Williamsburg Chapel
The Williamsburg Chapel is a non-denominational chapel.

Notable burials

 Lloyd Alexander (1924–2007) – Author of children's fantasy fiction books. Won the Newbery Medal for "The High King" in 1969.
 Jack Clements (1864–1941) – Major League Baseball Player. Played as a catcher for 17 seasons (1884 to 1900).
Robert J. Clendening (1914–1982) – Pennsylvania State Representative 1949–52.
 William Adolphus Crouse (1866–1941) – Spanish–American War Medal of Honor recipient.
 Wes Curry (1860–1933) – Major League baseball umpire and player from 1884–98.
 Benjamin F. James (1885–1961) – Republican member of the U.S.  and Pennsylvania Houses of Representatives
 Alan MacDiarmid (1927–2007) – Recipient of the Nobel Prize for Chemistry in 2000.
 John F. Mackie (1835–1910) – United States Marine and Civil War recipient of the Medal of Honor.
 Sherry Magee (1884–1929) – Left fielder in Major League Baseball.
Albert Magnin, Pennsylvania State House representative for Delaware County, 1889–92.
 Ruth Malcomson (1906–1988) – Miss America 1924.
 William H. Milliken, Jr. (1897–1969) – Republican member of the U.S. House of Representatives from Pennsylvania.
 Harry O'Neill (1917–1945) – American baseball player who appeared in one 1939 game for the Philadelphia Athletics, but was one of only two major league baseball players killed in action during World War II.
 Sarkis Torossian (1891–1954) – Decorated Ottoman, French, and British commander of Armenian descent.
 Morrie Rath (1886–1945) – American Major League Baseball player.
 Theodore F. Smith (1852–1925) – Indian Wars Medal of Honor recipient.
 U. E. Baughman (1905–1978) – Chief of the United States Secret Service under Presidents Truman, Eisenhower, and Kennedy.
 David M. Buchanan (1862–1936) Peacetime Navy Medal of Honor recipient.
 John H. White (Medal of Honor), American Civil War recipient of the Medal of Honor.

References

External links
 
 
 

1895 establishments in Pennsylvania
Cemeteries established in the 1890s
Cemeteries in Delaware County, Pennsylvania